Pedro Antonio García Betanzos (born April 2, 1991, in Mexico City) is a Mexican professional footballer who last played for Atlante F.C. on loan from América.

References

1991 births
Living people
Mexican footballers
Club América footballers
C.F. Mérida footballers
Lobos BUAP footballers
Atlante F.C. footballers
Liga MX players
Ascenso MX players
Liga Premier de México players
Tercera División de México players
Footballers from Mexico City
Association footballers not categorized by position